William Angus (4 June 1871 – 15 May 1965) was a Scottish-born Australian politician and farmer.

Angus was born in Keithhall, Aberdeenshire, Scotland and was educated at the University of Aberdeen, gaining a B.Sc. (Agriculture) in 1900. He arrived in South Australia in 1904 and became professor (later director) of agriculture and secretary to the minister of agriculture.
After a year of farming, Angus was elected to the South Australian House of Assembly as member for Victoria and Albert from February 1912 to May 1915 and as member for Albert May 1915 to April 1921. Angus was chairman of committees in 1920 and secretary of the parliamentary Liberal Party.

References

 

1871 births
1965 deaths
Members of the South Australian House of Assembly
People from Aberdeenshire
British emigrants to Australia